This was the first edition of the tournament. It was originally supposed to be held in 2020 but was canceled due to the COVID-19 pandemic.

Juan Bautista Torres won the title after defeating Benjamin Hassan 7–6(7–2), 6–2 in the final.

Seeds

Draw

Finals

Top half

Bottom half

References

External links
Main draw
Qualifying draw

Internationaux de Tennis de Troyes - 1